Vrchy (until 1947 Valtéřovice) is a municipality and village in the Nový Jičín District in the Moravian-Silesian Region of the Czech Republic. It has about 200 inhabitants.

References

Villages in Nový Jičín District